Mac Grealy (born 6 March 2002) is an Australian rugby union player who plays for the  in Super Rugby. His playing position is fullback. He was named in the Reds squad for the 2021 Super Rugby AU season.

Reference list

External links
itsrugby.co.uk Profile
Queensland Reds profile

2002 births
Australian rugby union players
Living people
Rugby union fullbacks
Queensland Reds players